The endosomal sorting complexes required for transport (ESCRT) machinery is made up of cytosolic protein complexes, known as ESCRT-0, ESCRT-I, ESCRT-II, and ESCRT-III.  Together with a number of accessory proteins, these ESCRT complexes enable a unique mode of membrane remodeling that results in membranes bending/budding away from the cytoplasm. These ESCRT components have been isolated and studied in a number of organisms including yeast and humans. A eukaryotic signature protein, the machinery is found in all eukaryotes and some archaea.

The ESCRT machinery plays a vital role in a number of cellular processes including multivesicular body (MVB) biogenesis, cellular abscission, and viral budding. Multivesicular body (MVB) biogenesis is a process in which ubiquitin tagged proteins enter organelles called endosomes via the formation of vesicles. This process is essential for cells to destroy misfolded and damaged proteins. Without ESCRT machinery, these proteins can build up and lead to neurodegenerative disease. For example, abnormalities in ESCRT-III components can lead to neurological disorders such as hereditary spastic paraplegia (HSP). Cellular abscission, the process by which the membrane connecting two daughter cells is cleaved, is also mediated by ESCRT machinery. Without the ESCRT complexes, daughter cells could not separate and abnormal cells containing twice the amount of DNA would be generated. These cells would inevitably be destroyed through a process known as apoptosis. Lastly, viral budding, or the process by which specific types of viruses exit cells, may not occur in the absence of ESCRT machinery. This would inevitably prevent viruses from spreading from cell to cell.

ESCRT complexes and accessory proteins

Each of the ESCRT complexes and accessory proteins have unique structures that enable distinct biochemical functions. A number of synonyms exist for each protein component of the ESCRT machinery, both for yeast and metazoans. A summary table of all of these proteins is provided below.

In yeast, the following complexes/accessory proteins exist as follows:

ESCRT-0
The ESCRT-0 complex plays a vital role in the generation of multivesicular bodies by binding and clustering ubiquitinated proteins and/or receptors on the surface of a cell. The complex is then responsible for binding to a lipid on the endosomal membrane, which recruits these tagged proteins to the endosome. Once properly localized, these proteins are then taken into the endosome via vesicles, forming multivesicular bodies, and are eventually delivered to the lysosome where they are degraded. This process is essential as it is the major pathway for the degradation of damaged proteins that have passed through the Golgi. The components of the ESCRT-0 complex exist as follows:

The complex is a 1:1 heterodimer of Vps27 (vacuolar protein sorting protein 27) and Hse1. Vps27 and Hse1 dimerize through antiparallel coiled-coil GAT (so named after proteins GGA and Tom1) domains. Both Vps27 and Hse1 contain an amino-terminal VHS domain (so named because it is contained in Vps27, HRS, and STAM proteins). These VHS domains bind the ubiquitin on proteins the cell aims to degrade. Ubiquitin can also associate with ubiquitin interacting motifs such as the one on Hse1 or the double sided domain found on Vps27. A FYVE domain (named after the four proteins in which it was initially identified: Fab1p, YOTB, Vac1, and EEA1) is found sandwiched between the VHS and ubiquitin interacting motif domains of Vps27. Phosphatidylinositol 3-phosphate, a common endosomal lipid, binds to this FYVE domain resulting in the recruitment of ESCRT-0 to the endosome.

ESCRT-I
The role of the ESCRT-I complex is to assist in the generation of multivesicular bodies by clustering ubiquitinated proteins and acting as a bridge between the ESCRT-0 and ESCRT-II complexes. It also plays a role in membrane recognition and remodeling during membrane abscission by forming rings on either side of the  midbody of dividing cells. ESCRT-I is also responsible for recruiting ESCRT-III, which forms the constriction zone just before the cells separate. Furthermore, ESCRT-I plays a role in viral budding by interacting with specific viral proteins, leading to recruitment of additional ESCRT machinery to the potential site of viral release.  Details of the ESCRT-I machinery are described below.

The ESCRT-I complex is a heterotetramer (1:1:1:1) of Vps23, Vps28, Vps37, and Mvb12. The assembled heterotetramer appears as a rod-shaped stalk composed of Vps23, Vps37, and Mvb12 with a fanned cap composed of single helices of Vps23, Vps28, and Vps37. Vps23 contains one ubiquitin E2 variant domain, which is responsible for the binding of ubiquitin, the ESCRT-0 complex, and to the PTAP (proline, threonine, alanine, proline) motif of viral Gag proteins.  Just after this ubiquitin E2 variant domain, a proline rich motif (GPPX3Y) is present that directs ESCRT-I to the midbody during membrane abscission. Mvb12 can also bind ubiquitin via its carboxy-terminus. Vps28 is responsible for the interaction of ESCRT-I and ESCRT-II by associating with the GLUE domain (GRAM-Like Ubiquitin-binding in EAP45) of Vps36 through its carboxy-terminal four-helix bundle domain.

ESCRT-II
The ESCRT-II complex functions primarily during the biogenesis of multivesicular bodies and delivery of ubiquitin tagged proteins to the endosome. Ubiquitin tagged proteins are passed from ESCRT-0 to ESCRT-I and then to ESCRT-II. ESCRT-II associates with ESCRT-III, which pinches the cargo containing vesicle closed. The specific aspects of ESCRT-II are as follows:

ESCRT-II is a heterotetramer (2:1:1) composed of two Vps25 subunits, one Vps22, and one Vps36 subunit. Vps25 molecules contain PPXY motifs, which bind to winged-helix (WH) motifs of Vps22 and Vps36 creating a Y-shaped complex with Vps22 and Vps36 as the base and Vps25 molecules as arms. Vps25 molecules also contain WH motifs that are responsible for the interaction of ESCRT-II with ESCRT-III. Vps36 contains a GLUE domain that binds phosphatidylinositol 3-phosphate and Vps28 of ESCRT-I. Two zinc finger domains are looped into the GLUE domain of yeast Vps36. One of these zinc finger domains binds the carboxy-terminal domain of Vps28 and the other associates with ubiquitin.

ESCRT-III
The ESCRT-III complex is likely the most important of all the ESCRT machinery because it plays a role in all ESCRT mediated processes. During membrane abscission and viral budding, ESCRT-III forms long filaments that coil around the site of membrane constriction just prior to membrane cleavage. This mediation of abscission occurs through interactions with the centralspindlin complex.  These filamentous structures are also present during multivesicular body formation and function as a ring-like fence that plugs the budding vesicle to prevent cargo proteins from escaping into the cell's cytosol. ESCRT-III exists and functions as follows:

The ESCRT-III complex differs from all other ESCRT machinery in that it exists only transiently and contains both essential and nonessential components. The essential subunits must assemble in the proper order (Vps20, Snf7, Vps24, then Vps2) for the machinery to function. Nonessential subunits include Vps60, Did2, and Ist1. Vps20 initiates assembly of ESCRT-III by acting as a nucleator of Snf7 polymer assembly. Vps24 then associates with Snf7 to cap the complex and recruit Vps2. Vps2 then brings Vps4 to the complex. All “free” cytosolic forms of each subunit are considered closed. That is, the carboxy-terminal portion of each subunit folds up onto itself in an autoinhibitory manner stabilizing the monomeric subunits. The carboxy-terminus of most ESCRT-III subunits, both essential and nonessential, contain MIMs (MIT (microtubule interacting and transport domain) interacting motif) motifs. These motifs are responsible for binding Vps4 and the AAA-ATPase spastin.

Vps4-Vta1
The Vps4-Vta1 proteins are required for the stripping of other ESCRT components (usually ESCRT-III) from membranes once a particular process has been completed. There is some debate as to whether Vps4 cleaves the ESCRT-III complex away or remodels the complex so one component is shed at a particular time. Vta1 is thought to act as an activator of Vps4, aiding its assembly and enhancing its AAA-ATPase activity. The manner in which these proteins function is as follows:

Vps4 subunits have two functional domains, an amino-terminal MIT domain and a central AAA-ATPase domain. The MIT domain is responsible for the interaction of Vps4 with the MIM domain of Vps2. The AAA-ATPase domain hydrolyzes ATP to power disassembly of the ESCRT-III complex. This “stripping” of ESCRT-III allows all associated subunits to be recycled for further use. Vta1 is a dimeric protein containing one VSL domain (so named because it is found in the proteins Vps4, SBP1, and LIP5), which enables binding to Vps4, and a MIT domain for associating with ESCRT-III subunit Vps60. Though not essential, Vta1 has been shown to aid in Vps4 ring assembly, accelerate the ATPase activity of Vsp4, and encourage ESCRT-III disassembly.

Bro1
The main function of Bro1 is to recruit deubiquitinases to the ESCRT-III complex. This results in the removal of ubiquitin tags from proteins targeted for degradation in the lysosome just prior to the generation of multivesicular bodies. It has also been speculated that Bro1 helps stabilize ESCRT-III while ubiquitin tags are cleaved from cargo proteins.

Bro1 contains a Bro1 amino-terminal domain that binds to Snf7 of ESCRT-III. This binding brings Bro1 to the site of membrane abscission. Bro1 also binds the catalytic domain of Doa4, an ubiquitin hydrolase (deubiquitinase), bringing it to the site of abscission. Doa4 removes ubiquitin from cargo proteins being targeted to the lysosome.

Multivesicular body biogenesis and cargo shuttling

Multivesicular bodies play a large role in the transport of ubiquitinated proteins and receptors to a lysosome. ESCRT complexes transport ubiquitinated cargo to cellular vesicles that bud directly into the cell’s endosomal compartment, forming multivesicular bodies. These multivesicular bodies eventually fuse with the lysosome causing degradation of the cargo. A more in-depth description of the process, including associated machinery, exists as follows:
 ESCRT-0 components Vps27 and Hse1 each bind to ubiquitinated cargo.
 Vps27 binds to phosphatidylinositol 3-phosphate, an endosomal lipid, which then recruits the entire complex to an endosome.
 Vps27 binds the Vps23 subunit of ESCRT-I, bringing ESCRT-I to the endosome. ESCRT-I can also bind ubiquitinated proteins.
 Vps36 associates with ESCRT-I subunit Vps28, resulting in the recruitment of the ESCRT-II complex.
 Vps25 subunit of ESCRT-II binds to and activates Vps20 of the ESCRT-III complex.
 Vps20 nucleates the formation of Snf7 strands that are then capped by Vps24.
 Vps24 recruits Vps2, which brings Vps4 to the complex.
 Vps4 forms a pore made of two hexameric rings upon which Vta1 binds. This Vps4-Vta1 complex triggers the disassembly of ESCRT-III and marks the end of multivesicular body formation.

Membrane abscission

Membrane abscission during cytokinesis is the process by which the membrane connecting two daughter cells is cleaved during cell division. Since it is conserved in a number of archaea, membrane abscission is considered to be the earliest role for ESCRT machinery. The process begins when the centrosomal protein Cep55 is recruited to the midbody of dividing cells in association with MKLP1, a mitotic kinesin-like protein that associates with microtubules. Cep55 then recruits the Vps23 subunit of ESCRT-I and accessory protein ALIX, which form into rings on either side of the midbody. ESCRT-I and ALIX recruit ESCRT-III via its Snf7 subunit. ESCRT-III subunits Vps20, Snf7, Vps24, Vps2, and Did2 form into a spiral-shaped fibril adjacent to the rings formed by Vps23. The formation of this spiral-like structure deforms the membrane and the AAA-ATPase spastin is brought in by Did2 and Ist1 to cleave the microtubules formed at the midbody. Vps4 then catalyzes the disassembly of the ESCRT-III complex resulting in two newly separated daughter cells. The process of membrane abscission was described using metazoan proteins as the process has been studied to a greater extent in metazoans.

Viral budding

The release of viral particles, also known as viral budding, is a process by which free virions are released from within cells via the hijacking of host cell ESCRT machinery. Retroviruses, such as HIV-1 and human T-lymphotropic virus, as well as a number of enveloped viruses, including the Ebola virus, require ESCRT machinery to exit the host cell. The process is initiated by viral Gag proteins, the major structural proteins of retroviral coats, which interact with TSG101 of the ESCRT-I complex and the ALIX accessory protein. ESCRT-III subunits (only CHMP4 and CHMP2 being essential) are recruited to the site of viral budding to constrict and sever the neck of the bud in a manner similar to that described for membrane abscission during cytokinesis. Vps4 then recycles the ESCRT-III components to the cytosol and the virus is released from the cell. The mechanism described here utilizes metazoan proteins, as viral budding has been studied more extensively in metazoans.

References

Cell anatomy
Organelles